The Emeryville Research Center of Shell Development Company in Emeryville, California was a major research facility of Shell Oil Company in the United States from 1928 until 1972, when Shell Development relocated to Houston, Texas.

Inventions, technical contributions, resources
Tricresyl phosphate (TCP) and other gasoline additives were developed at Emeryville. Tar sands extraction and other techniques to increase oil reserves were studied at bench scale and in pilot plants. Shell Development also pioneered de-sulfurization methods and standards for gasoline and motor oil, which were significant in reducing acid rain and other adverse environmental effects of auto exhaust gases. Shell Development scientist Thomas Schatzky also pioneered fingerprinting techniques to identify oil spills' origins.

Shell Development Emeryville scientists created the epoxy resins and expanded their applications. In an early dramatization of the new material, Shell Development's team recorded and pressed a musical performance on epoxy resin rather than on vinyl. A classical harpsichordist who was the wife of a scientist performed. Epoxy / carbon fiber and other advanced composites were also pioneered there.

Shell polymer scientists revised the scientific community's understanding of polymerization physics for styrene-butadiene rubber (SBR), a principal component of most tires since World War II.  After natural rubber from rubber trees was made unavailable by the Japanese conquest of Southeast Asia, SBR provided a new material for tires for the Allies' military vehicles. Shell's Charles Wilcoxen later demonstrated the kinetics of the polymerization process, amending the assumptions of the Ziegler-Natta polymerization equations for which a Nobel prize was awarded in 1963. Shell Development also pioneered a class of materials called block copolymers, useful for medical applications such as artificial heart valves.

Shell Development had significant capital assets and technical resources, including a cyclotron, an early and long-running electron microscope facility, an elaborate radiation laboratory (whose facilities became Veedercrest Winery), and other then-advanced scientific tools.

Shell Development Emeryville made many contributions to the U.S. space program, including development of rocket fuels, and handling techniques and storage methods for these highly explosive compounds. Shell Development's labs also contributed significant support to California-based land speed record holder Craig Breedlove and the Spirit of America vehicles.

Corporate culture
The American Chemical Society's archives refer to Shell Development as one of a small number of large, pre-eminent private research facilities on the West Coast. Shell scientists served as presidents and other officers of ACS during the decades when the facility was in operation.

Though self-identified as a conservative employer, many Shell scientists were politically progressive, championing causes such as the Sierra Club and no-growth economic strategies. Country Joe and the Fish, a '60's anti-war counterculture rock band, dedicated an early album to Martin Dimbat, a Shell Development scientist who contributed funding to their musical venture.

Unionized, with a comfortable work pace, elaborate medical benefits for employees, a company-paid lifetime retirement plan and almost-ironclad job security, Shell Development for decades provided the comforts of a socialistic work environment within a corporate giant of capitalism. Because of competitive disadvantages the company would experience if employees could publish freely, Shell Development scientists often experienced the minimal professional recognition compared to scientists in academia.

Shell Development's senior scientific ranks included scientists who had been graduate students of Glenn Seaborg, a Berkeley scientist who pioneered techniques to create and verify transuranium elements. Shell Development also bore the indirect imprint of Robert Oppenheimer, director of the Manhattan Project. Manhattan Project alumni worked at Shell / Emeryville, and Oppenheimer himself is asserted to have been an offstage force in unionizing parts of Shell Development's workforce.

After Shell Oil dissolved the Shell Development / Emeryville organization and decommissioned its facilities, its employee culture proved robust. For over forty years after Shell Development ceased to exist, employees continued monthly meetings at a marina restaurant nearby.  Citing uninterrupted recordkeeping among the surviving employees, a spokesperson reported that somewhat less than half of the known employees from Shell Development were still alive in late 2006. Meetings were finally suspended in 2007.

Shell Development's facilities languished briefly following its 1972 departure from its Emeryville campus. The properties then became an early home of biotechnology pioneers Cetus and Chiron. In the 21st century, many of the buildings of the former Shell Development campus are occupied by pharmaceutical giant Novartis.

References

Petroleum in California
Research institutes in California
Shell plc buildings and structures
Research institutes in the San Francisco Bay Area
Buildings and structures in Emeryville, California
Defunct oil companies of the United States
Energy companies established in 1928
Non-renewable resource companies established in 1928
Non-renewable resource companies disestablished in 1972
1928 establishments in California
1972 disestablishments in California